St. Bernard's Academy is a private, Roman Catholic high school in Eureka, California.  Located in the Roman Catholic Diocese of Santa Rosa in California, it is run independently by St. Bernard's Academy, Inc.

Background
St. Bernard's was established as an elementary school in 1912 by the Sisters of St. Joseph.  St. Bernard's High School was established in 1954. St. Bernard's currently offers a preschool, junior and senior high.

Academics
St. Bernard's Academy offers 13 advanced placement classes:  Art, European History, U.S. History, Latin Virgil IV, Spanish, English Language, English Literature, Macro Economics, Calculus AB, Calculus BC, Statistics, Physics 1, and Biology.

Athletics
St. Bernard's is a member of the Humboldt-Del Norte Conference (Redwood Empire) of the North Coast Section of the California Interscholastic Federation of the National Federation of State High School Associations.  The following sports are offered:  Football, Football Cheer Team, Girls' Volleyball, Girls' Soccer, Cross country, Girls' Tennis, Boys' Basketball, Girls' Basketball, Basketball Cheerleading, Wrestling, Baseball, Girls' Softball, Boys' Tennis, Track and Golf.

Notable alumni
Greg Shanahan - former MLB pitcher for the Los Angeles Dodgers.

External links

Notes and references

Catholic secondary schools in California
Buildings and structures in Eureka, California
Educational institutions established in 1954
High schools in Humboldt County, California
1954 establishments in California
Roman Catholic Diocese of Santa Rosa